Berny Ulloa Morera (born August 5, 1950) is a retired football referee from Costa Rica. He officiated the match between Argentina and Bulgaria at the 1986 World Cup.
He was a linesman in the famous game between England and Argentina in 1986 in which the Hand of God and Goal of the Century were scored by Diego Maradona. He was also a linesman in the final of the 1986 World Cup between Argentina and West Germany.

References

External links 
 
 
 

1950 births
Living people
Costa Rican football referees
FIFA World Cup referees
1986 FIFA World Cup referees
CONCACAF Gold Cup referees